Al-Anz  is a Syrian hamlet located in al-Hamraa Subdistrict in Hama District.  According to the Syria Central Bureau of Statistics (CBS), al-Anz had a population of 146 in the 2004 census.

References 

Populated places in Hama District